Walter Philip John Handmer  (died 2007) was an Australian public servant and diplomat.

Handmer was born in Bunbury, Western Australia.

Handmer joined the Department of External Affairs in 1951 as a cadet. Cadets were enrolled for one year of study at the Canberra University College School of Diplomatic Studies, followed by training that included language training in some cases. After completing their cadetship, Cadets were advanced to the rank of Third Secretary. In December 1953, Handmer and his wife left Canberra so that he could join the Australian diplomatic mission in Hong Kong. Whilst in Hong Kong, Handmer enrolled to study Mandarin at the Hong Kong University Language School.

In 1966 Handmer was Australia's Charge d'affaires in Taiwan, charged with 'paving the way' for the arrival of the appointed Ambassador Frank Bell Cooper.

From 1974 to 1977, Handmer was Australian High Commissioner to Kenya. His non-resident ambassadorial accreditations while on post in Kenya were Uganda, Ethiopia and the Seychelles. Haile Selassie, then Emperor of Ethiopia, received Handmer's credentials over a bowl of roses, flanked by guards with live cheetahs. A brass band played a rendition of Waltzing Matilda when he presented his credentials to Idi Amin, then President of Uganda. In 1977 Handmer was appointed Australian Ambassador to Israel.

Handmer was made a Member of the Order of Australia in the 1987 Australia Day Awards.

Handmer died in Canberra in 2007.

References

2007 deaths
Members of the Order of Australia
Ambassadors of Australia to Ethiopia
Ambassadors of Australia to Israel
Ambassadors of Australia to Myanmar
High Commissioners of Australia to Kenya
High Commissioners of Australia to Pakistan
High Commissioners of Australia to Singapore
University of Western Australia alumni